The First Stout-Vogel Ministry was a responsible government in New Zealand lasting less than a fortnight, not to be confused with the longer-lasting Second Stout-Vogel Ministry. It took office after the Continuous Ministry of Harry Atkinson fell to a confidence motion after the 1884 general election.

Background
At the 1884 general election, Sir Julius Vogel returned to New Zealand politics with a manifesto promising more public works spending than the previous government had provided, while also cutting taxes. It was unclear, however, which of the several factions would be able to command a majority, so it was only when the new House met in August that Vogel and the liberal Robert Stout were able to put together a Ministry. Stout was Premier, but Vogel was regarded as the real power in Cabinet. In disclaiming the Premiership for himself, Vogel suggested that it would be too difficult to lead in the House as well as put together a Budget on short notice.

Vogel and Stout were politically very different, leading to suspicions that they had only combined forces in order to save the speculative Waimea Plains Railway Company, with which they were both closely involved. James William Thomson moved a confidence motion alleging that they were “as different from each other as light is from darkness” and attracted votes from North Island members dissatisfied with the large number of South Islanders in the Ministry. Despite winning the motion 52-33, Thomson failed to attract supporters and instead advised the Governor to call Sir George Grey. Grey then attempted to form a coalition with Atkinson but was rebuffed, with the result that Atkinson returned to office for less than a week.

Stout and Vogel were able to return to power shortly thereafter with a reconstructed and more stable government.

Ministers
The following members served in the first Stout-Vogel Ministry:

See also
 New Zealand Government

Notes

References

Ministries of Queen Victoria
Governments of New Zealand
1884 establishments in New Zealand
Stout–Vogel Ministry
Stout–Vogel Ministry